Max Abramovitz (May 23, 1908 – September 12, 2004) was an American architect. He was best known for his work with the New York City firm Harrison & Abramovitz.

Life 
Abramovitz was the son of Romanian Jewish immigrant parents. He graduated in 1929 from the University of Illinois at Urbana-Champaign School of Architecture. While at Illinois, Abramovitz was a member of the Tau Epsilon Phi fraternity.  He later received an M.S. from Columbia University's architecture school in 1931. He also was the recipient of a two-year fellowship at the École des Beaux-Arts in Paris before returning to the US and becoming partners with Wallace Harrison from 1941 to 1976. In 1961, he was an invited resident (RAAR) of the American Academy in Rome.

Abramovitz died in September 2004 in Pound Ridge, New York, at the age of 96. His drawings and archives are held by the Avery Architectural and Fine Arts Library at Columbia University.  Abramovitz also received an honorary Doctorate in Fine Arts from the University of Illinois in 1970.

Work

Brandeis University

Abramovitz was a friend and student of Brandeis University president Abram L. Sachar, who recruited him to work on his new campus. For 30 years Abramovitz oversaw university planning, was a University Fellow and served on its Board of Overseers and the Creative Arts Commission. Abramovitz designed the "vast majority of buildings on the Brandeis campus" during the mid-1950s, including:

 The Three Chapels, 1955
 Slosberg Music Center, 1957
 Pearlman Hall, 1957
 The Rose Art Museum, 1961

Other work
 Jerome Greene Hall at Columbia University, New York, 1961
 David Geffen Hall at Lincoln Center, originally called Philharmonic Hall, and later Avery Fisher Hall, New York City, 1962
 three buildings for the University of Illinois at Urbana-Champaign, including the 1963 State Farm Center (formerly Assembly Hall), at its time the world's largest edge-supported dome, which is 400 feet in diameter and rises 128 feet above the floor, the 1969 Krannert Center for the Performing Arts, and the Hillel building
 Phoenix Life Insurance Company Building, Hartford, Connecticut, 1963
 Temple Beth Zion, Buffalo, New York, 1967 images
 the University of Iowa Museum of Art, and the Arts Campus of the University of Iowa, Iowa City, Iowa, 1968 onwards
 the International Affairs Building at Columbia University, New York, 1970
 the U.S. Steel Tower (also known as USX Tower) Pittsburgh, Pennsylvania, 1970
 National City Tower, Louisville, Kentucky, 1972
 the Tour Gan, La Defense, Paris, France, 1974
 the Learning Research and Development Center building, University of Pittsburgh, 1974
 One SeaGate, Toledo, Ohio, 1982 (as Abramovitz, Harris & Kingsland)
 AEP Building, Columbus, Ohio, 1983 (as Abramovitz, Harris & Kingsland)
 Capitol Square, Columbus, Ohio, 1984 (as Abramovitz, Harris & Kingsland)
 the Hilles Library, a new home for the Radcliffe College Library at Harvard
the Rockefeller Center, in New York City, and designed the interior of Radio City Music Hall in Rockefeller Center. Regarding the Classical Movement, he also created axial and symmetrical designs for the Embassy of the United States, New Delhi 1954, and the Kennedy Center for the Performing Arts 1961, in Washington.

References

External links
Obituary from New York Times, 15 Sep 2004
New York Architects Profile
Information on Harrison, Abramovitz, & Abbe - from Emporis.com
Information on Harrison & Abramovitz (the firm's earlier incarnation) - from Emporis.com
Max Abramovitz Architectural Records and Papers, 1926-1995.Held by the Department of Drawings & Archives, Avery Architectural & Fine Arts Library, Columbia University.
Architect Max Abramowitz, Designer of Avery Fisher Hall at Lincoln Center, Dies (Architectural Record, September 17, 2004)

1908 births
2004 deaths
Jewish architects
American people of Romanian-Jewish descent
Columbia Graduate School of Architecture, Planning and Preservation alumni
Modernist architects
University of Illinois School of Architecture alumni
Tau Epsilon Phi
Architects from New York City
20th-century American architects
People from Pound Ridge, New York
Fellows of the American Institute of Architects